Cynthia Folio (born December 24, 1954) is an American composer, flutist, and music theorist. She is a professor of Music Studies at Temple University, where she was honored with the Creative Achievement Award in 2012 and the Lindback Award for Distinguished Teaching in 1994. Cynthia’s compositions have been described as “confident and musical in expressing ideas of great substance.”
In addition, her work has been regarded as“ intriguing and enjoyable,” and “imaginatively scored.”

Life and career

Folio was born and raised in Belvoir, Virginia. She earned her Ph.D. in music theory and a Performers Certificate in flute from the Eastman School of Music.

As a flutist, she has performed extensively as a soloist in the Philadelphia area with Latin Fiesta, David’s Harp, the Silver and Wood Trio, the Philadelphia Classical Symphony, and Glaux, a contemporary music ensemble based at Temple University.

As a theorist, she has published many music theory articles, reviews, and book chapters on topics that focus primarily on the analysis of jazz, contemporary music, and the relationship between analysis and performance.

Awards

Folio has received commissions from organizations such as Network for New Music, the Relâche Ensemble, the Kirkwood Flute Ensemble, the Mendelssohn Club of Philadelphia, Music Teachers National Association, and the National Flute Association. She has earned 17 consecutive ASCAP Awards for composition.

Selected compositions

Some of Folio’s compositions include:

 Living Legacy (1998)
 At the Edge of Great Quiet (1998)
 Through Window’s Lattices (1998)
 Four 'Scapes (1999)
 Flute Loops (2000)
 Seven Aphorisms (2001)
 Two Songs on Poems by Stephen Dunn (2003)
 When the Spirit Catches You… (2004)
 Music Box (2005) 
 A Matter of Honor: A Portrait of Alexander Hamilton (2005)
 Hamilton (2007)
 Voyage: I, Too, Can Sing a Dream (2009)
 Sonata for Flute and Piano (2011)
 We The Poets (2012)

References

1954 births
Living people
People from Fauquier County, Virginia
Eastman School of Music alumni
21st-century American composers
American flautists
American music theorists
American women composers
21st-century women composers
Women flautists
Temple University faculty
American women academics
21st-century American women
21st-century flautists